Life history  may refer to:

 Life history theory, a theory of biological evolution that seeks to explain aspects of organisms' anatomy and behavior by reference to the way that their life histories have been shaped by natural selection
 Life history (sociology), the overall picture of an informant's or interviewee's life
 Medical life history, information gained by a physician by asking specific questions of a patient

See also
 Life cycle (disambiguation)